Hari Setiawan (born 10 November 1970) is an Indonesian weightlifter. He competed in the men's flyweight event at the 1996 Summer Olympics.

References

1970 births
Living people
Indonesian male weightlifters
Olympic weightlifters of Indonesia
Weightlifters at the 1996 Summer Olympics
Place of birth missing (living people)
20th-century Indonesian people